Samuel Kyle (1770 – 18 May 1848) was an Irish bishop in the Church of Ireland.

He was educated at Trinity College Dublin.

He was Provost of Trinity College Dublin from 1820 to 1831, Bishop of Cork and Ross from 1831 to 1835 and Bishop of Cork, Cloyne and Ross from then until his death on 18 May 1848.

His eldest son, Samuel Moore Kyle, became Archdeacon of Cork.

Notes

1770 births
1848 deaths
Alumni of Trinity College Dublin
Bishops of Cork and Ross (Church of Ireland)
Bishops of Cork, Cloyne and Ross
19th-century Anglican bishops in Ireland
Provosts of Trinity College Dublin